The Dry Tree (or Solitary tree) is a legendary tree. It was first recorded by Marco Polo, somewhere in the wastelands of northern Persia. According to Polo, it was the only tree within hundreds of kilometres of desert. According to legend, the Dry Tree marked the exact spot of a great battle between Alexander the Great and Darius. It is not clear whether this "great battle" refers to the Battle of Issus or the Battle of Gaugamela. The purported location—somewhere in Khorasan, near the border with present day Turkmenistan—is also impossible to ascertain, because Darius had already been assassinated when Alexander reached these regions.

Overview

Marco Polo describes the Dry Tree as large tree with green leaves on one side and white leaves on the other. For that reason, the Dry tree should be a plane tree.

The Dry Tree is described in the 14th century Travels of Sir John Mandeville. The tale runs that the Dry Tree has been lifeless since the crucifixion of Christ, but that it will flower afresh when "a prince of the west side of the world should sing a mass beneath it".

Legends of Alexander the Great tell that he found the phoenix, a bird able to bring itself back to life, in the branches of the Dry Tree.

A solitary dry tree is visible on the Issus-mosaic from Pompeii, showing where Alexander met Darius the Great of Persia.

The Dry Tree was reported by the Bavarian adventurer Johannes Schiltberger, who compared it to the Oak of Mamre. He said that Muslims called this tree "Kurrutherek" or "Sirpe". This last word is close to the Turco-Persian word meaning "cyperus". The Spanish ambassador Clavijo said that the tree was in Tabriz.

Real-world parallels

Although the story is a legend, solitary trees do exist. The Tree of Ténéré was such an isolated tree in the West-African state of Niger, serving both as a landmark and a national monument. The nearest tree to it was said to be 400 km away.

Legacy

In J. R. R. Tolkien's The Lord of the Rings, the symbol of the Kingdom of Gondor is a White Tree. It stands in the Court of the Fountain at the top of the city, dry and lifeless throughout the centuries that Gondor was ruled by the Stewards. It has been likened to the Dry Tree, since a sapling of the White Tree is found and brought into the city by the returning King, Aragorn.

See also
 List of individual trees

References

This page began as a translation of its French equivalent.

Individual trees
Medieval Khorasan